Löcknitz is a river in northern Germany (Mecklenburg-Vorpommern, Brandenburg and a few kilometres in Lower Saxony).

The Löcknitz originates south of Parchim, and flows through Karstädt, Lenzen, and Dömitz.

A different river Löcknitz arises in a protected valley in Eastern Brandenburg, contributing to Spree and then into Havel and Elbe as well.

See also 

List of rivers of Mecklenburg-Vorpommern
List of rivers of Brandenburg
List of rivers of Lower Saxony

References

Rivers of Mecklenburg-Western Pomerania
Rivers of Brandenburg
Rivers of Lower Saxony
Rivers of Germany